Muradup is a small town in the Great Southern region of Western Australia located between Kojonup and Boyup Brook. The town is situated along the Balgarup River.

Settlers had appeared in the area in the 1850s but it was not until 1899 that land was set aside for a townsite. The Shire of Kojonup requested for lots to be surveyed in 1905; this was carried out in 1906 and the town was gazetted in 1907 as Muradupp. More land was opened for selection in the area in 1909.

A railway siding existed in the town on the Kojonup to Bridgetown line.

In 1913 the local progress association asked for a school to be erected on a block that had been set aside in the town.

The lands department changed the name of the town from Muradupp to Muradup after deciding the double P at the end of the name was superfluous.

Land was granted in the area to returned soldiers in 1918. The first soldier to receive land was O. Fitzpatrick, who received 1,160 acres of land that had been confiscated from an "alien enemy subject" who had been interned.

The town was named after the nearby Mooradupp pool, which was first recorded in 1846 when the area was surveyed. The name is Aboriginal in origin but the meaning is not known.

References 
 

Great Southern (Western Australia)